J. Beale Johnson House is a historic home located near Fuquay-Varina, Wake County, North Carolina.  The house was built about 1906, and is a two-story, double pile, Classical Revival style frame dwelling. It is sheathed in weatherboard, sits on a brick foundation, hipped roof, and rear ell. It features a two-story pedimented front portico supported by Doric order columns and one-story wraparound porch with porte cochere.

It was listed on the National Register of Historic Places in 1991.

References

Houses on the National Register of Historic Places in North Carolina
Neoclassical architecture in North Carolina
Houses completed in 1906
Houses in Wake County, North Carolina
National Register of Historic Places in Wake County, North Carolina
1906 establishments in North Carolina